Hsu Sheng-san (born 16 April 1942) is a Taiwanese professional golfer.

Outside of Taiwan, Hsu played primarily on the Asia Golf Circuit winning seven tournaments and heading the Order of Merit in 1976, 1978 and 1982. His 1982 campaign started by losing out in a playoff at the opening event, the Philippine Open, having held a five stroke lead going into the final round, but he went on to win in India, Singapore and Thailand in consecutive weeks through the middle of the circuit to build a dominant position in the standings. Hsu also played on the Japan Golf Tour, winning once.

Hsu's first two victories in professional tournaments were as an amateur, in 1966 at the Okinawa Open, and in 1967 at the Philippine Open.

Professional wins (18)

Japan Golf Tour wins (1)

Japanese circuit wins (1) 
1966 Okinawa Open (as an amateur)

Asia Golf Circuit wins (7)
1967 Philippine Open (as an amateur)
1975 Indonesia Open
1976 Malaysian Open
1978 Thailand Open
1982 Indian Open, Singapore Open, Thailand Open

Other wins (9)
1969 ROC PGA Championship
1976 ROC PGA Championship
1980 Kaohsiung Open
1981 ROC PGA Championship, Kaohsiung Open
1982 Kaohsiung Open
1984 Kaohsiung Open
1985 ROC PGA Championship
1987 ROC PGA Championship

Team appearances
Amateur
Eisenhower Trophy (representing Taiwan): 1964, 1966, 1968

Professional
World Cup (representing Taiwan): 1976, 1978, 1988

References

External links

Hsu Sheng-san at the Taiwan PGA official site

Taiwanese male golfers
Japan Golf Tour golfers
1940s births
Living people